M. Srisha is an Indian Tamil playback singer and a state level shooting champion. She hails from Coimbatore, Tamil Nadu.

Early life and education 
Srisha started training for vocals at an early age of 8 and studied at SSVM institute. She got a chance to release her first album with music compose Dhina and launched multiple albums. Ms.Srisha is now studying entrepreneurship at the University of British Columbia, Vancouver.

Career 
Srisha launched her first album - Puthiya Bharathi -  at the age of 15 which was based on the poems of Subramania Bharathi. She further launched her second album Ashtmala and then third one named Srigadipen, in which she collaborated with singer-composer Srinivas. Her latest album is Aruyire where she has collaborated with lyricist Madhan Karky and musician Dharan Kumar.  At the same time, Srisha practices shooting and won numerous awards. She decided to switch to peep sight and is preparing for Olympics.

Awards and recognition 

 Gold medal and winning the Tamil Nadu State Shooting Championship at Madurai
 State record in the Sub Junior & Women category.
 Gold in the 10m open sight air rifle in the 16{+t}{+h} at All India Kumar Surendra Singh inter-school shooting championship, Pune

References 

Tamil playback singers
University of British Columbia people
Indian female sport shooters
21st-century Indian women singers
21st-century Indian singers
Year of birth missing (living people)
Living people